Colt 38 Special Squad is a 1976 Italian poliziottesco film. This film, by Massimo Dallamano, stars Ivan Rassimov and Marcel Bozzuffi.

Plot
Turin, Italy mid-1970s. When his wife becomes the latest innocent victim of a merciless Marseilles crime lord (Ivan Rassimov), police captain Vanni (Marcel Bozzuffi) goes beyond the law to form a secret squad of rogue cops, each armed with an unlicensed .38 Colt Diamondback revolver. As Vanni and his vigilante crew take back the night bullet by bullet, the Marseillaise joins the game by instigating a wave of violent crime that turns the city into a war zone.

Cast
Marcel Bozzuffi as Inspector Vanni
Carole André as Sandra
Ivan Rassimov as Il Marsigliese / Black Angel
Riccardo Salvino as Nicola Silvestri
Fabrizio Capucci as Ciro
Armando Brancia as Prosecutor
 Grace Jones as The Club Singer

Production
Colt 38 Special Squad was filmed at Cinestudi Dear in Rome and on location in Turin. The film would be director Massimo Dallamano's last film as he died on November 4, 1976 in a car accident. He was 59.

Releases
Colt 38 Special Squad was released in Italy on July 24, 1976 where it was distributed by P.A.C. It grossed a total of 1,285,707,500 Italian lira on its theatrical release in Italy. The film's success allowed it an in-name only sequel Return of the 38 Gang.

NoShame films released a DVD in 2006. This version included the Luciano Ercoli film La Bidonata.

See also 
 List of Italian films of 1976

Notes

References

External links

1976 films
1970s Italian-language films
1970s crime thriller films
1970s action thriller films
Poliziotteschi films
Italian vigilante films
Films directed by Massimo Dallamano
Films scored by Stelvio Cipriani
Films set in Turin
1970s Italian films